Nick Brandt (born 1964) is an English photographer. Brandt's work generally focuses on the rapidly disappearing natural world, as a result of environmental destruction, climate change and humans' actions.

Background and early career
Born in 1964 and raised in London, England, Brandt studied Painting, and then Film at Saint Martin's School of Art.
He moved to California in 1992 and directed many award-winning music videos for the likes of Michael Jackson ("Earth Song", "Stranger in Moscow", "One More Chance"), Moby ("Porcelain"), Jewel ("Hands"), XTC ("Dear God") among others.

It was in 1995 while directing "Earth Song" in Tanzania that Brandt fell in love with the animals and land of East Africa. In 2001, frustrated that he could not capture on film his feelings about and love for animals, he realized there was a way to achieve this through photography.

Photography

On This Earth
In 2001, Brandt embarked upon his first photographic project: a trilogy of work to memorialize the vanishing natural grandeur of East Africa.

This work bore little relation to the typical, color, documentary-style wildlife photography. Brandt's images were mainly graphic portraits more akin to studio portraiture of human subjects from a much earlier era, as if these animals were already long dead. "The resulting photographs feel like artifacts from a bygone era". Using a Pentax 67II with two fixed lenses, Brandt photographed on medium-format black and white film without telephoto or zoom lenses. He writes: "You wouldn't take a portrait of a human being from a hundred feet away and expect to capture their spirit; you'd move in close."

A book of the resulting photography, On This Earth, was released in 2005 and constituted 66 photos taken from 2000 to 2004 with introductions by the conservationist and primatologist Jane Goodall, author Alice Sebold, and photography critic Vicki Goldberg.

In the afterword, Brandt explained the reasons for the methods he used at the time: "I'm not interested in creating work that is simply documentary or filled with action and drama, which has been the norm in the photography of animals in the wild. What I am interested in is showing the animals simply in the state of Being. In the state of Being before they are no longer are. Before, in the wild at least, they cease to exist. This world is under terrible threat, all of it caused by us. To me, every creature, human or nonhuman, has an equal right to live, and this feeling, this belief that every animal and I are equal, affects me every time I frame an animal in my camera. The photos are my elegy to these beautiful creatures, to this wrenchingly beautiful world that is steadily, tragically vanishing before our eyes."

A Shadow Falls
Returning to Africa repeatedly from 2005 to 2008, Brandt continued the project. The second book in the trilogy, A Shadow Falls, was released in 2009 and featured 58 photographs taken during the preceding years.

Writing in the introduction, Goldberg states: "Many pictures convey a rare sense of intimacy, as if Brandt knew the animals, had invited them to sit for his camera, and had a prime portraitist’s intuition of character...as elegant as any arranged by Arnold Newman for his human high achievers."

In additional introductions, philosopher Peter Singer, author of Animal Liberation, explains why Brandt's photographs speak to an increasing human moral conscience about our treatment of animals: "The photographs tell us, in a way that is beyond words, that we do not own this planet, and are not the only beings living on it who matter".

Across the Ravaged Land
In 2013, Brandt completed the trilogy On This Earth, A Shadow Falls, Across the Ravaged Land (the titles designed to form one consecutive sentence) with Across the Ravaged Land. A book of the photography was released the same year.

Across the Ravaged Land introduced humans in Brandt's photography for the first time. One such example is Ranger with Tusks of Elephant Killed at the Hands of Man, Amboseli, Kenya 2011. This photograph features a ranger employed by Big Life Foundation, a foundation started by Brandt in 2010 to help preserve critical ecosystems in Kenya and Tanzania. The ranger holds the tusks of an elephant of the Amboseli region killed by poachers.

The Petrified
In 2013, Brandt released a photographic collection entitled The Petrified in which he collected animal carcasses petrified after drowning in the Lake Natron in Tanzania, as if their frozen carcasses were still perched in real life. The collection was featured in the Smithsonian Magazine.

Inherit the Dust

In 2014, Brandt returned to East Africa to photograph the escalating changes to the continent's natural world. In a series of panoramic photographs, he recorded the impact of man in places where animals used to roam. In each location, he erected a life size panel of one of his animal portrait photographs, setting the panels within a world of urban development, factories, wasteland and quarries.

A book of the work, Inherit the Dust, was published in 2016. In the book, Brandt writes, "We are living through the antithesis of genesis right now. It took billions of years to reach a place of such wondrous diversity, and then in just a few shockingly short years, an infinitesimal pinprick of time, to annihilate that."

Writing in LensCulture, editor Jim Casper stated: "The resulting wall-size prints are impeccably beautiful and stunning, as well as profoundly disturbing. They convey the vast spaces and light of contemporary Africa with a cinematic immersion and incredible detail. When standing in front of his images, the viewer is transported into the scenes – sometimes with wonder and awe and joy, and other times with overwhelming sadness, despair and disgust." Photography critic Michelle Bogre further noted: "Nick Brandt’s new photographic work, Inherit the Dust, is his visual cry of anguish about the looming apocalypse for animals habitats in Africa... The resulting images are simultaneously beautiful and horrifying, because they illustrate the irreconcilable clash of past and present".

This Empty World
Brandt's next project, This Empty World, was released in February 2019. The series was published in book form by Thames & Hudson. This new project, "addresses the escalating destruction of the African natural world at the hands of humans, showing a world where, overwhelmed by runaway development, there is no longer space for animals to survive. The people in the photos also often helplessly swept along by the relentless tide of 'progress.'”

Representing a thematic and technical evolution, the series required Brandt to develop and perfect a demanding new process. The Brooklyn Rail described it as:

Says Brandt, "People still think the major issue with the destruction of wildlife in Africa is poaching, but especially in East Africa it's no longer the biggest problem. The biggest problem is the population explosion that is happening. With that comes an invasion of humanity and development into what was not so long ago wildlife habitat."

The resulting large-scale prints (up to 60x130 in / 140x300 cm) were exhibited in near-simultaneous exhibitions in London (Waddington Custot), New York (Edwynn Houk Gallery), and Los Angeles (Fahey/Klein Gallery).

The Day May Break 
In September 2021, Brandt released a project titled The Day May Break, a series of photographs portraying people and animals that have been impacted by environmental degradation and destruction. The photographs for this series were taken by Brandt in Kenya and Zimbabwe late in 2020. Each photo captures threatened animals living in wildlife sanctuaries alongside people in those countries who have suffered from the effects of climate change such as farmers displaced and impoverished by years-long severe droughts. The people and animals were photographed together in the same frame at the same time, and were taken at five sanctuaries and conservancies. In October 2021, LA Weekly art critic Shany Nys Dambrot said of the question the project poses “​is whether the day will break like sunrise, or like glass. For as gorgeous, rich and operatic as the images are, this is not an Edenic vision of coexistence, it’s an urgent plea for taking action.” Photos from the project were featured in public exhibits in September 2021 at the Atlas Gallery in London and the Fahey Klein Gallery in Los Angeles, and in January 2022 at the Polka Gallery in Paris.

Big Life Foundation
In September 2010, in urgent response to the escalation of poaching in Africa due to increased demand from the Far East, Brandt founded the non-profit organization Big Life Foundation, dedicated to the conservation of Africa's wildlife and ecosystems.

With one of the most spectacular elephant populations in Africa being rapidly diminished by poachers, the Amboseli ecosystem—which straddles both Kenya and Tanzania—became the foundation's large-scale pilot project.

Headed up in Kenya by conservationist Richard Bonham, multiple fully equipped teams of anti-poaching rangers have been placed in newly built outposts in the critical areas throughout the more than  area. This effort has resulted in a dramatically reduced incidence of killing and poaching of wildlife in the ecosystem.

Big Life Foundation now employs several hundred rangers protecting approximately 2 million acres of ecosystem.

Bibliography
On This Earth (2005) 
A Shadow Falls (2009) 
On This Earth, A Shadow Falls (2014) 
Across the Ravaged Land (2013)
Inherit The Dust (2016) 
This Empty World (2019) 
The Day May Break (2021)

Selected exhibitions
2019: This Empty World, Fahey/Klein Gallery, Los Angeles
2019: This Empty World, Edwynn Houk Gallery, New York
2019: This Empty World, Waddington Custot, London
2018: Inherit the Dust, Meet the Meat
2017: Inherit the Dust, Multimedia Art Museum, Moscow
2017: Inherit the Dust, Custot Gallery, Dubai,
2016: Inherit the Dust, Fotografiska Museum, Stockholm
2016: Inherit the Dust, Edwynn Houk Gallery, New York
2016: Inherit the Dust, Fahey/Klein Gallery, Los Angeles 
2016: Inherit the Dust, Camera Work, Berlin
2016: On This Earth, A Shadow Falls Across The Ravaged Land, Stadthaus Ulm Museum, Ulm, Germany
2015: On This Earth, A Shadow Falls, Salo Art Museum, Finland
2015: On This Earth, A Shadow Falls Across The Ravaged Land, Fotografiska Museum, Stockholm
2014: On This Earth, A Shadow Falls, Galerie Nikolas Ruzicska, Salzburg, Austria
2013: Across The Ravaged Land, Camera Work, Berlin
2013: Across The Ravaged Land, Hasted Kraeutler, New York
2013: Across The Ravaged Land, Fahey/Klein Gallery, Los Angeles
2013: Across The Ravaged Land, Atlas Gallery, London
2013: On This Earth, A Shadow Falls, Preus National Museum of Photography, Oslo
2013: On This Earth, A Shadow Falls, Dunkers Kulturhus Museum, Helsingborg, Sweden
2012: On This Earth, A Shadow Falls, Hasted Kraeutler, New York
2012: On This Earth, A Shadow Falls, Fotografiska Museum, Stockholm
2010: A Shadow Falls, Camera Work, Berlin
2009: A Shadow Falls, Staley-Wise Gallery, New York
2009: A Shadow Falls, Fahey/Klein Gallery, Los Angeles
2006: African elegy, Staley-Wise Gallery, New York
2006: On This Earth, Camera Work, Berlin
2004: On This Earth, Camera Work, Hamburg

References

External links
 Official Website
 Big Life Foundation
 2010 Article Detailing Nick Brandt And The Endangered Species He Photographs
 Across the Ravaged Land pictures in Art Days

1964 births
Living people
Alumni of Saint Martin's School of Art
Photographers from London
English music video directors
British emigrants to the United Arab Emirates
Landscape photographers
Nature photographers